Ch'iyar Qullu (Aymara ch'iyara black, qullu mountain, "black mountain", also spelled Chiar Kkollu) is a  mountain in the Cordillera Real in the Bolivian Andes. It lies in the La Paz Department, Murillo Province, at the border of the La Paz Municipality and the Palca Municipality. Ch'iyar Qullu is situated south-west of the mountains Jathi Qullu and Q'asiri. It lies at the lake Jach'a Q'asiri, south-west of it.

References 

Mountains of La Paz Department (Bolivia)